Fluorescamine is a spiro compound that is not fluorescent itself,  but reacts with primary amines to form highly fluorescent products, i.e. it is fluorogenic. It hence has been used as a reagent for the detection of amines and peptides. 1-100 µg of protein and down to 10 pg of protein can be detected. Once bound to protein the excitation wavelength is 381 nm (near ultraviolet) and the emission wavelength is 470 nm (blue). This method is found to suffer of high blanks resulting of high rate of hydrolysis due to used excess concentration. Alternative methods are based on ortho-phthalaldehyde (OPA), Ellman's reagent (DTNB), or epicocconone.

Reaction

References

Lactones
Spiro compounds